Peter Bainbridge (born 1957 Melbourne) is a silkscreen artist 
He was a clothing artist Illustrator during the 80-90's and became a fashion photographer until 2009. He then published his own fashion arts broadsheet magazine in 2010 which the Sydney Morning Herald asked him to partner after seeing the first issue. He  has exhibited his clothes and knitwear together with partner Rose Borg at the Victoria and Albert Museum in London, America and Japan. He was commissioned by the National Gallery in Canberra and the Powerhouse Museum in Sydney for their permanent collections.
Peter started shooting fashion in 1994, and owned and operated Bluefish Hire Studio in Darlinghurst together with Rose Borg.

References

External links
Artist's website

Australian artists
1957 births
Living people